Scott McNealy (born November 13, 1954) is an American businessman. He is most famous for co-founding the computer technology company Sun Microsystems in 1982 along with Vinod Khosla, Bill Joy, and Andy Bechtolsheim. In 2004, while still at Sun, McNealy founded Curriki, a free online education service. In 2011, he co-founded Wayin, a social intelligence and visualization company based in Denver. McNealy stepped down from his position as CEO of Wayin in 2016.

Career
Unlike most people who become involved in high technology industries, McNealy did not come from the world of amateur programmers or hardware hackers; instead, his background was in business, having earned a Bachelor of Arts in economics from Harvard and an MBA from the Stanford Graduate School of Business. McNealy has self-deprecatingly referred to himself as a "golf major" rather than a computer scientist.

McNealy started out working at American Motors, where his father was vice chairman and vice president of marketing. He later became manufacturing director at Onyx Systems, a vendor of microprocessor-based Unix systems.

In 1982, he was approached by fellow Stanford alumnus Vinod Khosla to help provide the necessary organizational and business leadership for Sun Microsystems. Sun, along with companies such as Apple Inc., Silicon Graphics, 3Com, and Oracle Corporation, was part of a wave of successful startup companies in California's Silicon Valley during the early and mid-1980s. The name "Sun" was derived from co-founder Andy Bechtolsheim's original Stanford University Network (SUN) computer project, the SUN workstation.

In 1984, McNealy took over the CEO role from Khosla, who ultimately would leave the company in 1985. On April 24, 2006, McNealy stepped down as CEO after serving in that position for 22 years, and turned the job over to Jonathan I. Schwartz. McNealy is one of the few CEOs of a major corporation to have had a tenure of over twenty years.

According to the book The Decline and Fall of Nokia, Scott McNealy was the "dream candidate" to become CEO of Nokia in 2010. However, McNealy said he was not offered the job.

In 2017, Scott joined the golf app startup 18Birdies as advisor and equity partner.

In early 2018, he joined the Redis Labs Advisory Board.

Wayin
In 2010, the same year Oracle Corporation purchased Sun, McNealy co-founded the social media intelligence company Wayin. The new venture was not widely covered in the media—the day he invited reporters to his home to launch Wayin, was the same day Apple co-founder Steve Jobs died. Their product is an application store for brands to self-publish interactive advertising campaigns using reusable digital assets, removing the bulk of cost involved in delivering multi-channel digital advertising.

Wayin sought out and merged with EngageSciences in 2016, to acquire senior staff and diversify their market. In May of that year, McNealy stepped down as CEO and EngageSciences head Richard Jones became CEO of the combined company.
In July 2019, Wayin was acquired by Cheetah Digital.

Personal life
McNealy was born in Columbus, Indiana. He grew up in Bloomfield Hills, Michigan, where his father, Raymond William McNealy Jr. (1927–2014), was vice chairman of the American Motors Corporation. He graduated from Cranbrook School; he later supported the campaign of fellow Cranbrook alumnus and 2012 presidential nominee Mitt Romney. Most of his work experience prior to joining Sun was in automotive manufacturing.

He is married to Susan McNealy; they live in Nevada, and have four sons: Maverick, Dakota, Colt, and Scout. He is known to be an enthusiastic ice hockey player and has been ranked as one of the best golfers in executive ranks.

He is the commissioner of the Alternative Golf Association (known as "Flogton").

Positions at Sun
 Chairman of the board of directors from April 2006 to January 2010
 Chairman of the board of directors and chief executive officer from April 2004 to April 2006
 Chairman of the board of directors, president and chief executive officer from July 2002 to April 2004
 Chairman of the board of directors and chief executive officer from April 1999 to June 2002
 Chairman of the board of directors, president and chief executive officer from December 1984 to April 1999
 President and chief operating officer from February 1984 to December 1984
 Vice president of operations from February 1982 to February 1984

Awards
In 1987, McNealy was named an Award Recipient of the EY Entrepreneur of the Year Award in the Northern California Region.

Opinions
In 1999, McNealy said, "You have zero privacy anyway. Get over it." Writer Stephen Manes criticized the statement in his Full Disclosure column: "He's right on the facts, wrong on the attitude.... Instead of 'getting over it', citizens need to demand clear rules on privacy, security, and confidentiality." The authors of Privacy in the 21st Century admitted, "While a shocking statement, there is an element of truth in it."

McNealy was an early advocate of the networked environment; his company's motto was The Network is the Computer. At times, he has been known to be skeptical of products that do not integrate well with networked environments. One example McNealy has given involved the Apple iPod. As quoted in The Register, McNealy said, "There’s a pendulum thing where stuff is on the client side and then goes back into the network where it belongs. The answering machine put voicemail by the desk, and then it went back into the network. Your iPod is like your home answering machine. I guarantee you it will be hard to sell an iPod five or seven years from now when every cell phone can access your entire music library wherever you are."

McNealy is a self-proclaimed "raging libertarian", although he often supports and endorses the Republican Party. He makes regular appearances on the Fox Business Channel to discuss libertarian business issues. In 2017, McNealy praised the 45th U.S. President, Donald Trump, for his free-market economic policies. On September 17, 2019, McNealy hosted a fundraiser for Donald Trump's re-election campaign.

McNealy was a member of the 1776 Commission.  Created by President Donald Trump, it released a report two days before the end of that administration.

References

External links

 
 Scott McNealy's biography at the International Directory of Business Biographies
 Computer History Museum, 11-Jan-2006: Sun Founders Panel
 
 
 Marketplace: "A different way of doing business", a radio interview with McNealy
 McNealy's foray into providing educational resources to school children worldwide
 USA Today story about McNealy and other CEOs who have played golf with Tiger Woods
 McNealy meets with a group of UK entrepreneurs (2008 video)
 McNealy to Ellison: How to duck death by open source

 
 
 

 
 
 

 
 

 
 
 

1954 births
Living people
American computer businesspeople
American libertarians
American technology chief executives
Businesspeople in software
Cranbrook Educational Community alumni
Fellows of the British Computer Society
Harvard University alumni
People from Columbus, Indiana
Stanford Graduate School of Business alumni
Sun Microsystems people
American chief operating officers